The Act Too Group is a Mid-Sussex based amateur theatre company who produced the first amateur European production of Mel Brooks' musical The Producers.

History 
The group was founded in 1991. 

The group also produced one of 8 limited release amateur runs of The Witches of Eastwick prior to general release, winning them their second NODA award following Copacabana in 2006. They followed this up with a third in 2007 with their production of We Will Rock You.

In 2009  the company was invited to perform at the NODA presidential inauguration ceremony in Leicester.

In November 2014 the company put on Avenue Q.

Awards 

 NODA Area Councillors Accolades of Excellence for Copacabana (2006), We Will Rock You (2007), and The Witches of Eastwick

External links 

 Official Facebook

References

Amateur theatre companies in England
Companies based in Sussex